The Charles Tillinghast House was an historic house at 243-245 Thames Street in downtown Newport, Rhode Island.  It was a -story timber-frame structure, with a side-gable roof.  Built c. 1710–20, it was one of the oldest buildings in the city.  It was probably built by Charles Tillinghast, whose family was among the founders of Rhode Island.  The house had a distinctive cove-shaped plaster cornice, typically only found on houses of this period. It was one of the first houses to be built on Thames Street.

The house was listed on the National Register of Historic Places in 1972.  It was demolished shortly thereafter to make way for an extension of America's Cup Highway to Memorial Boulevard.

See also
National Register of Historic Places listings in Newport County, Rhode Island

References

Houses on the National Register of Historic Places in Rhode Island
Houses in Newport, Rhode Island
National Register of Historic Places in Newport, Rhode Island
Historic district contributing properties in Rhode Island